Pettend is a village in Fejér County, Hungary.

External links 
http://www.terkepcentrum.hu/index.asp?go=map&mid=7&tid=21926

Populated places in Fejér County